The Louisiana Insurance Commissioner is a statewide constitutional office that regulates the insurance industry in Louisiana. The Insurance Commissioner serves as the head of the Louisiana Department of Insurance, which consists of ten divisions; Consumer Advocacy, Financial Solvency, Health Insurance, Legal Services, Licensing & Compliance, Minority Affairs, Management & Finance, Public Affairs, Property & Casualty, and Receivership.

Louisiana is one of 11 states that elect the chief insurance regulator. The first office holder was Rufus D. Hayes, who was appointed by the governor in 1957, then elected for another term. The current Insurance Commissioner is Jim Donelon. Three of the four insurance commissioners prior to Donelon, Jim Brown, Sherman A. Bernard, and Doug Green, have been convicted of federal crimes and spent time in prison.

List of Insurance Commissioners

References

External links
 Louisiana Department of Insurance

Insurance Commissioner